Lori Saint-Martin ( – 22 October 2022) was a Canadian author and literary translator. Her first novel, Les Portes closes, came out in 2013. Working with her husband Paul Gagné, she translated over seventy English language books into French, including the works of such authors as Maya Angelou, Margaret Atwood, and Naomi Klein.

Saint-Martin died on 22 October 2022, at the age of 62.

Works
Saint-Martin taught literature at the Université du Québec à Montréal (UQÀM). As a specialist of women's studies and Quebec literature, she published several scholarly works on these subjects. As an author, she has published three short story collections and a novel.

Fiction:
2014 – Mathématiques intimes  (short stories)
2013 – Les Portes closes (novel)
1999 – Mon père, la nuit (short stories)
1991 – Lettre imaginaire à la femme de mon amant (short stories)

Non-Fiction:
2011 – Postures viriles : ce que dit la presse masculine (Éditions du remue-ménage)
2010 – Au-delà du nom : la question du père dans la littérature québécoise actuelle (Presses de l'Université de Montréal)
2002 – La voyageuse et la prisonnière : Gabrielle Roy et la question des femmes (Boréal)
1999 – 
1997 – Contre-voix : essais de critique au féminin (Nuit blanche)
1992–1994 – L'autre lecture : La critique au féminin et les textes québécois (XYZ)

Selected translations (with Paul Gagné): 
2008 – Tant que je serai noire (Maya Angelou, The Heart of a Woman)
2008 – La Stratégie du choc (Naomi Klein, The Shock Doctrine) 
2008 – 28 (Stephanie Nolen, 28)
2006 – Contre-la-montre : combattre le sida en Afrique (Stephen Lewis, Race Against Time: Searching for Hope in AIDS-Ravaged Africa)
2006 – Cibles mouvantes : essais 1971–2004 (Margaret Atwood, Moving Targets: Writing with Intent, 1982–2004)
2005 – L'Odyssée de Pénéloppe (Margaret Atwood, The Penelopiad) 
2001 – La Perte et le fracas (Alistair MacLeod, No Great Mischief)

Awards and recognition
Paul Gagné and Lori Saint-Martin have been jointly awarded several translation prizes throughout their career. These include the John Glassco Translation Prize in 1993, the QWF Translation Prize in 2004, 2006 and 2008 and the Governor General's Award in 2000, 2007 and 2015. They have also been shortlisted for the Governor General's Award an additional twelve times.

References

1950s births
Year of birth missing
2022 deaths
21st-century Canadian novelists
Canadian translators
Canadian women novelists
20th-century Canadian non-fiction writers
Academic staff of the Université du Québec
21st-century Canadian women writers
20th-century Canadian women writers
Governor General's Award-winning translators
Canadian women non-fiction writers
English–French translators